The New England Civil War Museum and Research Center was originally started by local Civil War veterans in 1896.   It was not until March 1994 that it was formally established as a museum and opened to the public.  It is located within the Memorial Building, inside a former Grand Army of the Republic (GAR) Hall in Rockville, Connecticut. Thomas F. Burpee Post #71 of the Grand Army of the Republic held their meetings in the Grand Hall from 1890 until 1929.  Alden Skinner Camp #45 of the Sons of Union Veterans of the Civil War, their direct heir, have held their monthly meetings in the hall since 1890, making it the oldest, continuously used GAR Hall in the entire country.

Holdings and history
Most of the museum's original collection was donated by the Civil War veterans of Burpee Post.  The museum's collection today holds several hundred items from the Civil War period.  Most notable are the Hirst brothers' collection (14th Connecticut Volunteer Infantry), the Thomas F. Burpee collection (Colonel, 21st Connecticut Volunteer Infantry), Kilbourne Newell collection (14th Connecticut Volunteer Infantry) and the Charles Weston collection (musician, 5th & 7th Connecticut Volunteer Infantry).

The museum also contains the O'Connell-Chapman Library, which has over 1000 volumes of Civil War literature, in addition to original copies of the 128 volumes of The War of the Rebellion: a Compilation of the Official Records of the Union and Confederate Armies. This was compiled by the US War Department and originally published from 1880–1901.  The Library also owns the original Civil War map books that accompanies the Office Records and several photographs of local Civil War veterans.

The building has the Grand Hall, an outer room, and a kitchen. The museum and library, along with the hall and its rooms, are the property of the Alden Skinner Camp #45 of the Sons of Union Veterans of the Civil War.  Fifteen years ago, the Museum acquired part of its original property from the town of Vernon.  Once owned by the GAR, the property was annexed by the town and used as a jail cell.

The Memorial Hall is also used for meetings by the Connecticut Commandery of the Military Order of the Loyal Legion of the United States (MOLLUS).

Notable events held in the GAR Hall

 August 9, 1892: Reunion of the 5th Connecticut Regiment
 September 16, 1893: Reunion of the 14th Connecticut Regiment
 August 18, 1896: Reunion of the 25th Connecticut Regiment
 September 17, 1909: Reunion of the 14th Connecticut Regiment
 September 20, 1920: Reunion of the 11th Connecticut Regiment

See also
 Grand Army of the Republic Hall (disambiguation), listing of halls in numerous places
 National Civil War Museum

References

External links 
 "New England Civil War Museum", Official Website
 The War of the Rebellion: a Compilation of the Official Records of the Union and Confederate Armies, Making of America, Cornell University Digital Collection

Connecticut in the American Civil War
Connecticut
American Civil War museums in Connecticut
Museums in Tolland County, Connecticut
Military and war museums in Connecticut